NewJeans is a South Korean girl group formed by ADOR, a subsidiary of Hybe Corporation. The group is composed of five members: Minji, Hanni, Danielle, Haerin and Hyein. The group pre-released their debut single "Attention" on July 22, 2022, preceding their debut eponymous extended play, which was released on August 1, 2022.

Name
The group's name, NewJeans, is a double entendre. It alludes to the idea that jeans are a timeless fashion item and the group's intention to carve a timeless image for themselves. The name is also a word play on the phrase "new genes", referring to the group ushering a new generation of pop music.

History

2019–2021: Formation and pre-debut activities
Preparations for a new girl group to debut under Big Hit Entertainment began as early as 2019 under the direction of Min Hee-jin, who joined the company as CBO that same year and is widely recognized for her art direction as visual director at SM Entertainment. Global auditions took place between September and October 2019, and casting into the group commenced from the beginning of 2020. Dubbed "Min Hee-jin's Girl Group" by several media outlets, the group was originally scheduled to launch in 2021 as a collaborative project between Big Hit and Source Music, but was later postponed due to the COVID-19 pandemic. In late 2021, the project moved to Hybe's newly established independent label ADOR, after Min was appointed the label's CEO. A second round of global auditions were held between December 2021 and January 2022, and the group's line-up was finalized in March 2022.

Prior to debuting with NewJeans, several group members were already active in the entertainment industry. Danielle was a regular cast member of tvN's Rainbow Kindergarten, a variety show that aired in 2011. Hyein debuted as a member of the children's music group U.SSO Girl in November 2017 under the stage name U.Jeong, before departing from the group one year later. In December 2020, she re-debuted as a member of the music group and YouTube collective Play With Me Club via PocketTV, and graduated from the group on May 3, 2021. Hanni and Minji made cameo appearances in BTS's 2021 music video for "Permission to Dance".

2022–present: Introduction and debut

On July 1, 2022, ADOR teased the launch of their new girl group by posting three animated videos of the numbers "22", "7" and "22" on their social media accounts, fueling speculation that content would be released on July 22. The group released the music video for their debut single "Attention" on July 22 as a surprise release, without any prior promotion or information on the group's lineup. The move has been described by Billboard as "risky-but-ultimately invigorating", crediting its success to "an emphasis on the music before anything else". The video, which amassed over 1.3 million views in less than 24 hours, was followed by an announcement of their debut self-titled extended play containing four tracks, including two additional singles. On July 23, the group's second single "Hype Boy" was released alongside a 50-second clip revealing the names of the members, further accompanied by four other music videos for the song, specific to the members' perspectives. A music video for their B-side "Hurt" was released two days later. Pre-orders for the EP surpassed 444,000 copies in three days. 

On August 1, NewJeans digitally released their debut self-titled EP alongside its third single, "Cookie". The EP was physically released on August 8 and sold over one million copies, becoming the best selling debut album in South Korea. The group made their broadcast debut on Mnet's M Countdown on August 4, performing all three singles from their EP. They won Best New Artist at the 2022 Melon Music Awards.

NewJeans released "Ditto" on December 19, 2022, as the first single from their single album, OMG. The song became NewJeans' first entry on both the Billboard Hot 100, peaking at number 82, and the UK Singles Chart, charting at number 95. OMG was released on January 2, 2023. It peaked at number one on South Korea's Circle Album Chart, selling 700,000 copies in its first week of release. Reviewers commended the album for its retro-style theme.

Other ventures

Ambassadorship 
Individually, four of the members became ambassadors for fashion and beauty brands: Hanni for Gucci and Armani Beauty, Hyein for Louis Vuitton, Danielle for Burberry, and Minji for Chanel Korea.

The entire group was then named as the global brand ambassadors for fashion brand, Levi's.

NewJeans was appointed public relations ambassadors by the city of Seoul in February 2023. That same month, it was announced they will promote the upcoming Seoul Fashion Week as honorary ambassadors.

Endorsements 
NewJeans was selected by Korean fashion store Musinsa as their global brand ambassador, with the intention of expanding globally and targeting a young audience. They are the face of Korean glasses brand Carin. NewJeans has modeled for SK Telecom's "0(영, Young)" campaign, promoting the iPhone 14 Pro, Shinhan Bank's "New Sol" campaign, promoting the bank's mobile app Sol, LG Electronics's commercial for their Gram laptop, 's advertisement for their 2024 0 Won Mega Pass, 5252 by OiOi's pictorial for their signature down jacket, McDonald's Korea, and Nike's "Air Max Day" campaign.

In collaboration with both Musinsa and LG Electronics, the group released a limited edition of the Gram laptop, the "LG Gram Style NewJeans Limited Edition Big Bunny", with gadgets inspired by NewJeans' concept. Outfits matching the laptop were available to customers who had made a reservation for LG Electronics's pop-up store, opened in Seongsu-dong, Seoul in January 2023 to promote the product.

Philanthropy 
On February 17, 2023, NewJeans donated  million to the World Food Programme alongside ADOR to help victims of the 2023 Turkey–Syria earthquake.

Influences and impact 
Fashion designer Yoon Ahn named the group among the influences for the fall 2023 ready-to-wear collection of her brand, Ambush.

Members 

 Minji 
 Hanni
 Danielle
 Haerin
 Hyein

Discography

Extended plays

Single albums

Singles

Other charted songs

Filmography

Television series

Videography

Music videos

Awards and nominations

Notes

References

External links

 

 
K-pop music groups
Musical groups established in 2022
South Korean girl groups
South Korean dance music groups
South Korean pop music groups
Musical groups from Seoul
2022 establishments in South Korea
Hybe Corporation artists
Geffen Records artists